Beta macrocarpa, the large-fruited beet, is a species of flowering plant in the family Amaranthaceae, native to the Canary Islands and the shores of the Mediterranean. It is widely used to study beet necrotic yellow vein virus in an effort to improve the sugar beet.

References

macrocarpa
Flora of the Canary Islands
Flora of North Africa
Flora of Portugal
Flora of Spain
Flora of the Balearic Islands
Flora of Sardinia
Flora of Italy
Flora of Sicily
Flora of Greece
Flora of Crete
Flora of Turkey
Flora of Cyprus
Flora of Palestine (region)
Plants described in 1826